Herwin Novianto is an Indonesian film director who won the Citra Award for Best Director at the 2012 Indonesian Film Festival for his drama Tanah Surga... Katanya (Land of Heaven... They Say).
He later directed Aisyah, biarkan kami bersaudara  in 2016 which starred Laudya Cynthia Bella.

Biography
Novianto made his feature film debut in 2009 with Jagad X Code, for which he also wrote the story. Jagad X Code was set in a village alongside Code Stream in Yogyakarta, which had received support from Y. B. Mangunwijaya but was forced to be self-sufficient after Mangunwijaya's death. It followed three youths from the village who, unable to buy the things they want owing to omnipresent poverty, agree to find a flash drive for a local thug.

In 2011 Novianto's television film Papi, Mami, dan Tukang Kebun (Father, Mother, and the Gardener) won twelve prizes at the FTV Awards in Jakarta, including Best Director.

Novianto's second feature film, Tanah Surga... Katanya, was released in 2012. He won the Citra Award for Best Director for the film, being selected over more established directors such as Hanung Bramantyo and Teddy Soeriaatmadja; the film itself was selected as Best Film. Novianto described it as a surprise, but suggested he was burdened by the prize because he would be pressured to produce better work the following year.

At another ceremony in Jakarta, Novianto received a Vidia Award for Best Director for Pahala Terindah (The Most Beautiful Reward), one of eight awards received by the television film. It followed a polygamous marriage in the Dieng Plateau of Central Java and starred Slamet Rahardjo and Ratna Riantiarno.

Filmography

References

Works cited

External links

Living people
Indonesian film directors
Citra Award winners
1965 births